Joseph Michael Smith (born March 22, 1984) is an American professional baseball pitcher who is currently a free agent. He has previously played in MLB for the New York Mets, Cleveland Indians, Los Angeles Angels, Chicago Cubs, Toronto Blue Jays, Houston Astros, Seattle Mariners, and Minnesota Twins. Smith attended Wright State University and was drafted by the Mets in the third round of the 2006 Major League Baseball draft. He made his major league debut in 2007.

High school and college 
A three-year varsity letterman at Amelia High School and a Division I All-Fort Ancient Valley Conference honoree, Smith also pitched five years for the select American Amateur Baseball Congress Midland team in Cincinnati.  Even though his labrum surgery, he was dedicated to returning to baseball. 

In college at Wright State University, he was redshirted and played three years in Horizon League competition. Ultimately, Smith became Wright State's closer his junior and senior year, as he gained 4–6 mph on his fastball after changing his delivery.  He had 13 saves his senior season and a 0.98 ERA. In three seasons Smith posted 22 saves, 145 strikeouts, and 39 walks. In 2005, he was the WSU team MVP and in 2006 he was awarded second-team All-Mideast Region, first-team Horizon League, Horizon League Pitcher of the Year, and WSU Most Valuable Male Athlete.

In the late summer of 2004, Smith played summer ball with the New England Collegiate Baseball League with the North Adams Steeplecats. In 2005, Smith briefly pitched for the Rockville Express, a team in the Cal Ripken, Sr. Collegiate Baseball League. In 2005, he made nine appearances for the Express, posting a 4.66 ERA, a 1–0 record, and earning two saves. Later in the summer of 2005, Smith also pitched for the Edenton Steamers in the Coastal Plain League. In 16 regular-season appearances, totaling 17.1 innings, he tallied nine saves with a 2.08 ERA, .197 batting average against, and struck out 19 batters. He also recorded the final out of the 2005 Petitt Cup tournament, on a comebacker, to give Edenton its second consecutive league championship. Less than two years later, Smith became the first Steamers' alumnus to appear in the majors.

Professional career

New York Mets
Smith first began his career with Brooklyn (A) of the New York–Penn League by allowing two runs, one earned, in one inning of work against the Staten Island Yankees on June 21. He was named one of the top 20 prospects in the New York–Penn League by Baseball America. When Duaner Sánchez was hurt during a taxi cab incident in 2006, Mets general manager Omar Minaya considered recalling Smith to the Majors. Instead, the Mets traded for Roberto Hernández and Óliver Pérez to give Smith more time in the minors. On March 24, 2007, after a strong spring training, it was announced Smith would be on the Mets' 25-man roster. On April 1, 2007, Smith made his major league debut. He struck out one (Preston Wilson) and walked one (Albert Pujols). He also gave up a single to David Eckstein. Smith earned his first major league win on April 24, 2007 after coming on in relief in the 12th inning. Smith enjoyed much success at the beginning of 2007, but began to tire and was sent down to the minors at mid-year. Smith was with the Mets for all of the 2008 season, enjoying varied success. He went 6–3 in 63.3 innings with a 3.55 ERA.

Cleveland Indians

On December 10, 2008, Smith was traded by the Mets to the Cleveland Indians as part of a twelve-player, three-team deal. On January 18, 2013, the Cleveland Indians announced they had avoided arbitration with Smith, signing him to a one-year contract worth $3.15 million.

Smith became a free agent following the 2013 season, but expressed interest in remaining with the Tribe.

Los Angeles Angels of Anaheim / Los Angeles Angels

On November 24, 2013, Smith reportedly agreed to a three-year contract for $15 million with the Los Angeles Angels of Anaheim, pending the completion of a physical. On November 27, 2013, the Angels confirmed that the team and Smith agreed to the terms. On April 25, 2014, Smith was named the Angels' new closer after multiple struggles by former closer Ernesto Frieri. After the Angels traded for San Diego Padres' All-Star closer Huston Street on July 18, 2014, Smith was moved to an eighth-inning setup role. Smith finished 2014 with 15 saves in 76 games, achieving a 1.81 ERA on 1105 pitches. 

On June 8, 2016, Smith went on the disabled list with a hamstring injury.

Chicago Cubs
On August 1, 2016, the Angels traded Smith to the Chicago Cubs for prospect Jesus Castillo. In 16 more appearances with the Cubs to finish 2016, Smith had a 1-1 record and a 2.51 ERA. Overall in 2016, combined with both teams he played for, Smith made 54 total appearances with a 1-4 record and a 3.82 ERA. Smith was a member of the Cubs' 2016 World Series championship team but did not make any postseason appearances.

Toronto Blue Jays
On February 9, 2017, Smith signed a one-year, $3 million contract with the Toronto Blue Jays. Smith became the Blue Jays setup man early in the season, after Jason Grilli struggled in the role and Joe Biagini was moved to the starting rotation. He was placed on the 10-day disabled list on June 19 with shoulder inflammation. In 38 games, he was 3-0 with a 3.28 ERA in  innings.

Return to Cleveland
On July 31, 2017, the Blue Jays traded Smith to the Cleveland Indians for Thomas Pannone and Samad Taylor. In  innings, he had an ERA of 3.44 for the Indians.

Houston Astros
On December 13, 2017, Smith signed a two-year contract with the Houston Astros worth $15 million. In his first season in Houston, Smith appeared in 56 games, recording a record of 5-1 in  innings  with a 3.74 ERA. On December 13 while working out, Smith suffered a ruptured left Achilles tendon. He underwent surgery for it on December 20.

In 2019, Smith was 1–0 with a 1.80 ERA in 28 relief appearances in which he pitched 25.0 innings.

On December 16, 2019, Smith resigned with the Astros on a two-year contract worth $8 million.

Smith did not play in the abbreviated 60-game 2020 season and forfeited his $4M salary after returning to Ohio to spend time with his mother who was battling the final stages of Huntington's disease.  Smith returned to the Astros in 2021, but struggled to a 7.48 ERA in 27 appearances with the team.

Seattle Mariners
On July 27, 2021, Smith was traded to the Seattle Mariners along with Abraham Toro in exchange for Rafael Montero and Kendall Graveman.

Minnesota Twins
On March 20, 2022 Smith signed with the Minnesota Twins. On August 3, 2022, the Twins designated Smith for assignment. He was released on August 5, 2022.

Pitching style
Smith's pitching style is different from most. According to hitters, he comes at the batter from third base. His release point is about 4:30 on the analog clock, lower than sidearm, and higher than  submarine. Smith's fastball usually is at 88–90 mph, sometimes reaching 93 mph. His fastball can even be considered a sinker because of its hard downward movement. He routinely gets ground balls because of this. Smith also throws a slider and a changeup.

Personal life
Smith is married to Turner Sports reporter Allie LaForce.

In 2012, Smith's mother was diagnosed with Huntington's disease; the condition leads to the death of nerve cells in the brain. Smith has a 50% chance of inheriting the condition. Smith and LaForce dedicate much of their free time to raising awareness for their organization HelpCureHD.org, which provides funding for couples to go through the PGD-IVF process as a way to stop the disease from continuing to future generations. HelpCureHD.org has become one of the country's premier organizations for Huntington's disease and has been featured on ESPN, Good Morning America, MLB Network, and many local media outlets.

References

External links

1984 births
Akron Aeros players
American expatriate baseball players in Canada
Baseball players from Cincinnati
Binghamton Mets players
Brooklyn Cyclones players
Buffalo Bisons (minor league) players
Chicago Cubs players
Cleveland Indians players
Columbus Clippers players
Houston Astros players
Living people
Los Angeles Angels players
Major League Baseball pitchers
Minnesota Twins players
New Orleans Zephyrs players
New York Mets players
Seattle Mariners players
Toronto Blue Jays players
Wright State Raiders baseball players